"Busy Earnin' is a 2014 single by Jungle. It peaked at number 19 on the UK Indie Chart, number 27 on Ultratop and number 118 on the French Singles Chart.

Background
"Busy Earnin is Jungle's third single from their eponymous debut album and was released digitally on 7 April 2014 and in vinyl format on 15 April on XL Recordings. It was premiered on Metropolis with Jason Bentley on KCRW, and details the circumstances of spending too much time making money.

Music video
A music video was released onto YouTube on 28 February 2014. It was directed by JLW and Oliver Hadlee Pearch and features the large dance ensemble featured on the band's debut album performing a choreographed routine in a large warehouse caused to shake by the track, and follows the theme of the first two videos "Platoon" and "The Heat".

Chart performance
The song peaked at number 19 on the UK Indie Chart and at number 27 on Ultratop chart in Belgian Flanders region in March, and at number 118 in France in July 2014.

Appearances in other media
"Busy Earnin is also included in the playlists of FIFA 15 and Forza Horizon 2 and it was featured in the opening sequence and credits for Episode 1 of Tales from the Borderlands and it played as a background music in a bar in Season 2 Episode 6 of Brooklyn Nine-Nine. It was also featured in the Showtime program House of Lies during the sixth episode of season four; and during the pilot episode of British comedy show Chewing Gum (TV series). It was also voted in at Number 67 in the 2014 Triple J Hottest 100 Countdown in Australia. It also appeared on NME's "Top 50 Tracks of 2014" at #13. It and Time from the song's parent album were performed on Jimmy Kimmel Live! on 16 June 2014, while Busy Earnin' and the album track Julia were performed on Late Night with Seth Meyers.

In April 2017 Busy Earnin' was used for the Toyota Yaris Hybrid TV advert.

In May 2018 the song was used during an advertisement for NPR's Marketplace.

The Song was also used in the penultimate episode of season 10 of American Television Series Shameless.

Episode 10, Season 2 of Superstore, an American comedy series, features the song Busy Earnin' by Jungle.

References

2014 singles
2014 songs
Jungle (band) songs
XL Recordings singles